Wish is the second studio album by jazz saxophonist Joshua Redman; it was released in 1993 by Warner Bros. Records.

Background
Joshua Redman said that "one of the reasons I wanted to work with these guys — aside from the obvious fact that they're masters — is because they're master storytellers." He said he was pleased with it because "it has a definite collective identity, a real organic unity."

Reception
The AllMusic review by Alex Henderson notes that although the album could have easily been avant-garde (due to Charlie Haden and Billy Higgins having been part of Ornette Coleman's quartet), it is actually a "mostly inside post-bop date". He also praises Redman's "ability to provide jazz interpretations of rock and R&B songs", saying that "in Redman's hands, Stevie Wonder's "Make Sure You're Sure" becomes a haunting jazz-noir statement, while Eric Clapton's ballad "Tears in Heaven" is changed from moving pop/rock to moving pop-jazz", noting that the latter could be called "smooth jazz with substance."

It peaked at number 1 on the Billboard Top Jazz Albums chart.

Track listing

Personnel
 Joshua Redman – tenor saxophone
 Pat Metheny – guitar
 Charlie Haden – double bass
 Billy Higgins – drums

References

External links
 

Joshua Redman albums
1993 albums
Albums produced by Matt Pierson